Nanda Gokula is a 1972 Indian Kannada-language drama film directed by Y. R. Swamy and produced by Shyamprasad Enterprises. It starred Rajkumar, Ramesh and Jayanthi. Vijaya Bhaskar scored the music and the story was written by Chi. Udaya Shankar.

Plot
Sridar abandons his family and marries Mohini, the daughter of a rich business tycoon. However, Sridar's father, who meets with an accident, wishes to reunite with his son before dying.

Cast 
 Rajkumar 
 Jayanthi 
 Ramesh
 Balakrishna
 K. S. Ashwath
 Dwarakish
 B. V. Radha
 Vijayasree
 M.N Lakshmi Devi
 Sampath
 Dinesh
 Advani Lakshmi Devi
 Shakti Prasad
 Srinath in a guest appearance

Soundtrack 
The music of the film was composed by Vijaya Bhaskar.

Track list

See also
 Kannada films of 1972

References

External links 
 

1972 films
1970s Kannada-language films
Indian black-and-white films
Indian drama films
1972 drama films
Films scored by Vijaya Bhaskar
Films directed by Y. R. Swamy